Qinglongqiao West railway station is a station of Jingbao Railway in Badaling Town, Yanqing District, Beijing.

Note that there are two stations at Qinglongqiao. In the southbound direction do the trains use the eastern switchback, reversing at Qinglongqiao railway station.

Schedule

See also

List of stations on Jingbao railway

Railway stations in Beijing